Toshikazu Shiozawa (January 28, 1954 – May 10, 2000), better known by the stage name Kaneto Shiozawa, was a Japanese actor, voice actor and narrator from Tokyo. At the time of his death, he was attached to Aoni Production. He had a distinctive calm, aristocratic-sounding voice, which often typecast him as villainous or anti-heroic strategists and intellectuals. His stage name originated from the Japanese director Kaneto Shindō.

Life and career
Shiozawa graduated from Nihon University Second Senior High School, where he learned to perform in its art department.

On May 9, 2000, at 4pm, Shiozawa fell down the stairs of his home in Shinjuku, Tokyo. Despite claiming that he was “alright”, Shiozawa fell unconscious and was rushed to the Tokyo Medical University Hospital; he died of a cerebral contusion at 12am on May 10, at the age of 46. Fellow voice actor Hidekatsu Shibata was one of the attendees at his funeral. Shiozawa's ongoing roles were replaced by other voice actors after his death.

Hikaru Midorikawa said, "Kaneto Shiozawa was my hero."

Due to his death, two of the characters he played (Zato-1 from Guilty Gear and Hyo from Rival Schools) were killed off in-universe. Zato-1 was replaced by the shadow parasite Eddie (voiced by Takehito Koyasu), who took over Zato's body following his death until Guilty Gear Xrd.

Voice roles

Anime television
1975
Ikkyū-san as Sadaaki

1977
Ippatsu Kanta-kun as Jiro

1979
Mobile Suit Gundam as M'Quve, Omur Fang, and Job John

1980
Space Runaway Ideon as Joliver Ira
Space Warrior Baldios as Marin Reigan

1981
Galaxy Cyclone Braiger as Blaster Kid
GoShogun as Leonardo Medici Bundle

1982
Galactic Gale Baxinger as Billy the Shot

1983
Ai Shite Knight as Eiji Tono
Mirai Keisatsu Urashiman as Adolf von Ludwig
Sasuraiger as Rock Anlock

1984
Adventures of the Little Koala as Weather
Fist of the North Star as Rei
Kinnikuman as Geronimo, Screw Kid

1985
Dancouga – Super Beast Machine God as Ryō Shiba
High School! Kimengumi as Dai Monohoshi

1986
Dragon Ball as Namu, Tenron
Saint Seiya as Aries Mu, Ankoku Andromeda

1987
City Hunter as Wakagashira

1988
Soreike! Anpanman as Hamigakiman
Transformers: Super-God Masterforce as Road King

1990
Nadia: The Secret of Blue Water as Emperor Neo

1992
Boyfriend as Masao Takatō

1993
Art of Fighting as John Crawley
Miracle Girls as Hideaki Kurashige
Pretty Soldier Sailor Moon as Prince Demande

1994
Crayon Shin-chan as Buriburi Zaemon

1995
Street Fighter II V as Balrog Fabio La Cerda

1996
The Vision of Escaflowne as Zongi

1997
Dragon Ball GT as Sān Xīng Lóng
Mach GoGoGo as Handler

1998
Legend of Basara as Ageha
Flame of Recca as Magensha
Silent Möbius as Ganossa Maximillian
Weiß Kreuz as Kikyo
Yu-Gi-Oh! as Shadi

1999
Detective Conan as Inspector Ninzaburo Shiratori
Chiisana Kyojin Microman as Demon Green
Crest of the Stars as Dusanyu
Digimon Adventure as Devimon

2000
Banner of the Stars as Dusanyu
Gate Keepers as Yasutaka Fukuoka

2001
Banner of the Stars II as Dusanyu (Library Recording)

OVA
 1984 Birth as Kim
 1985 Area 88 as Shin Kazama
 1985 Megazone 23 - Part I as B.D.
 1985 Vampire Hunter D as D
 1986 Blue Comet SPT Layzner as Ru Kain
 1986 Megazone 23 - Part II as B.D.
 1987 Bubblegum Crisis as J.B. Gibson
 1987 Kaze to Ki no Uta: Sanctus -Sei naru kana- as Auguste Beau
 1987 To-y as Tōi "To-y" Fujii
 1989 Blood Reign: Curse of the Yoma as Marou
 1988 Bride of Deimos as Kaname Ōba
 1988 Hades Project Zeorymer as Saiga
 1988 Legend of the Galactic Heroes as Paul Von Oberstein
 1988 Vampire Princess Miyu as Larva
 1989 ARIEL Visual as Hauser
 1989 Earthian as Dr. Ashino (Professor Ashiya)
 1989 Fūma no Kojirō as Yōsui
 1990 Aries as Zeus
 1990 Cyber City Oedo 808 as Merill "Benten" Yanagawa
 1990 Transformers: Zone as Sonic Bomber
 1991 ARIEL Deluxe as Hauser
 1991 Kyūkyoku Chōjin R as R. Ichiro Tanaka
 1992 Ai no Kusabi as Iason Mink
 1993 The Heroic Legend of Arslan as Narcasse
 1994 Baki the Grappler as Shinogi Koushou
 1994 Phantom Quest Corp. as Nakasugi
 1997 Agent Aika as Rudolf Hagen
 1998 Twilight of the Dark Master as Kudo
 2000 Angelique: Shiroi Tsubasa no Memoire as Clavis

Films
 1980 Phoenix 2772 as Godo
 1981 Mobile Suit Gundam as Omur Fang
 1981 Mobile Suit Gundam: Soldiers of Sorrow as M'Quve
 1982 Mobile Suit Gundam: Encounters in Space as M'Quve
 1983 Genma Taisen as Shirō Eda
 1984 The Star of Cottonland as Nekomania
 1985 The Dagger of Kamui as Shingo
 1985 Kinnikuman: Counterattack! The Underground Space Choujins as Geronimo
 1985 Kinnikuman: Hour of Triumph! Seigi Choujin as Geronimo
 1986 Fist of the North Star as Rei
 1986 Crisis in New York! as Geronimo
 1986 Seigi Choujin vs. Senshi Choujin as Geronimo
 1987 Bats & Terry as Terry
 1987 Lupin III: The Plot of the Fuma Clan/Lupin III: The Fuma Conspiracy as Goemon Ishikawa XIII
 1988 Urusei Yatsura Movie 5: Kanketsuhen (The Final Chapter): as Rupa
 1989 HYPER-PSYCHIC-GEO GARAGA as Randy
 1989 Saint Seiya: Warriors of the Final Holy Battle as Mu
 1990 Carol as Clark
 1991 Ranma ½: The Battle of Nekonron, China! A Battle to Defy the Rules! as Kirin
 1994 Crayon Shin-chan: The Secret Treasure of Buri Buri Kingdom as Saari
 1994 Street Fighter II: The Animated Movie as Balrog (Vega in the English version)
 1996 Doraemon: Nobita and the Galaxy Super-express as Baum
 1996 Crayon Shin-chan: Adventure in Henderland as Buriburizaemon
 1997 Doraemon: Nobita and the Spiral City as Thomas Mejison
 1997 Case Closed: The Time Bombed Skyscraper as Detective Ninzaburo Shiratori/Ninzaburo Santos
 1997 Crayon Shin-chan: Pursuit of the Balls of Darkness as Tsuyoshi/Lavender
 1998 Case Closed: The Fourteenth Target as Detective Ninzaburo Shiratori/Ninzaburo Santos
 1998 Crayon Shin-chan: Blitzkrieg! Pig's Hoof's Secret Mission as Buriburizaemon
 1999 Case Closed: The Last Wizard of the Century as Inspector Ninzaburo Shiratori/Ninzaburo Santos
 1999 Crayon Shin-chan: Explosion! The Hot Spring's Feel Good Final Battle as Buriburi Zaemon
 2000 Case Closed: Captured in Her Eyes as Inspector Ninzaburo Shiratori/Ninzaburo Santos

Video games
Battle Arena Toshinden series as Duke Rambert
Black/Matrix as Gaius
Dragoon Might as Yamato, Tekkamen and Ryan
Dragon Knight II as Narrator
Dragon Knight IV as Angus, Lucifon and Necromancer
Double Dragon (Neo-Geo) as Jimmy Lee and Amon
Down Load as Syd
Exile series as Sadler
Farland Story: Yottsu no Fuuin as Diva
Guilty Gear series as Zato-1, Dr. Baldhead
Hokuto No Ken: Seikimatsu Kyūseishu Densetsu as Rei
Kessen as Ōtani Yoshitsugu
Langrisser series as Böser/Paul
Last Bronx as Joe Inagaki
Legend of Dragoon as Melbu Frahma
Magic School Lunar! as Memphis
Metal Gear Solid as Cyborg Ninja
Metal Gear Solid 2: Sons of Liberty as Cyborg Ninja (archived recordings)
Policenauts as Tony Redwood
Puyo Puyo (PC-Engine version) as Mummy 
Rival Schools series as Hyo Imawano
Silent Bomber as Benoit
Snatcher as Randam Hajile, Elijah Madnar and Ivan Rodriguez
Street Fighter EX series as Kairi and Vega
Strider Hiryu (1994 PC-Engine version) as Strider Hiryu 
Tales of Phantasia (Super Famicom and PlayStation versions) as Dhaos
Valis IV (PC-Engine version) as Galgear

Dubbing
Das Boot (1983 Fuji TV edition) - Fähnrich Ullmann (Martin May)
Edward Scissorhands - Edward Scissorhands (Johnny Depp)
Freejack - Alex Furlong (Emilio Estevez)
Labyrinth - Jareth (David Bowie)
Q&A - ADA Al Reilly (Timothy Hutton)
The Rose - Huston Dyer (Frederic Forrest)
Star Wars (1992 TV Asahi edition) - Luke Skywalker (Mark Hamill)
Teenage Mutant Ninja Turtles (VHS releases) - Raphael
UHF - George Newman ("Weird Al" Yankovic)
West Side Story (1990 TBS edition) - Riff (Russ Tamblyn)

Tokusatsu
1995: Chouriki Sentai Ohranger as Bara Brain
1996: B-Fighter Kabuto as Deep Sea Fish-man Dezzle / Dezzle the Great
1998: Seijuu Sentai Gingaman as Dark Merchant Biznella / Majin Biznella

Drama CD
110 Ban wa Koi no Hajimari series 1: 110 Ban wa Koi no Hajimari as Kousuki Shinoda
Abunai series 3: Abunai Bara to Yuri no Sono as Reiji Segawa
Abunai series 5: Abunai Shiawase Chou Bangaihen as Reiji Segawa & Fuyuomi Oosawa
Ai no Kusabi series 1 as Iason
Ai no Kusabi series 2: Dark Erogenous as Iason
Analyst no Yuutsu series  1: Benchmark ni Koi wo Shite as Isao Washizaki
Angel Sanctuary as Sevothtarte (first voice)
Boxer Wa Inu Ni Naru series 1: Boxer Wa Inu Ni Naru as Cain
Boxer Wa Inu Ni Naru series 2: Doctor Wa Inu wo Kau as Cain
Boxer Wa Inu Ni Naru series 4: Akuta Wa Inu wo Enjiru as Cain
Chougonka ~Song of Eternal Hatred~ as Benten
Hanashizu no Utage as Shinobu Fujishiro
Kinkanshoku as Kart
Koi no Shinsatsushitsu as Souhei Hoshina
Kyūkyoku Chōjin R as R. Ichiro Tanaka
La Vie En Rose as Noboru Ootori
Lesson XX as Masato
Mirage of Blaze series 3: Konoyoruni Tsubasa wo as Terumoto Mouri
My Codename is Charmer as Makoto Hasegawa
Que Sera, Sera as Shuuichirou Himuro
Romantist Taste as Asafumi Aoyama
Stanley Hawk no Jikenbo ~AMBIVALENCE . Katto~ as Misao Jin
The Dark Blue as Olivier Sheridan
Street Fighter EX Drama CD as Kairi

Successors
Takumi Yamazaki—Super Robot Wars as Blaster Kid, Billy the Shot, Rock. Saint Seiya as Aries Mu in Hades Arc/Soul of Gold/Videogames. Metal Gear Solid: Bande Dessinée  as Grey Fox/Cyborg Ninja. Mobile Suit Gundam: The Origin as M'Quve
Kazuhiko Inoue—Case Closed as Detective Ninzaburo Shiratori
Daisuke Sakaguchi—Anpanman as Toothpaste Man
Masahiko Tanaka—Mobile Suit Gundam as M'Quve
Isshin Chiba—Fist of the North Star (2005 video game) as Rei, Super Robot Wars as Byman Haggard, West Side Story as Riff (2014 version)
Wataru Takagi—Votoms (PlayStation 2 version) as Byman Haggard
Shin-ichiro Miki—Fist of the North Star: The Legends of the True Savior as Rei
Makoto Ueki—Fist of the North Star Nintendo DS version as Rei
Kōki Harasawa—Fist of the North Star (software version) as Rei
Mitsuru Miyamoto—Saint Seiya: Legend of Sanctuary as Mu
Kousuke Okano—High School! Kimengumi table hockey game as Monohoshidai
Yasuyuki Kase—Sunrise Heroes as Le Cain, ACE as Le Cain
Hideyuki Tanaka—Vampire Hunter (movie version) as D Officer (Japanese dub), Angelique Trois: Kravis Officer, Angelique Etoile: as Kravis Officer
Hiroshi Yanaka—Vampire Hunter (game version) as D Officer
Takehito Koyasu—Guilty Gear Series as Zato, Area 88 as Shin Kazama, Far East of Eden as Orochimaru, Fist of the North Star: Ken's Rage as Rei
Takashi Kondo—Guilty Gear Drama CD as Dr. Bordeaux
Kotaro Shibata—Megazone 23 as BD
Eiji Takemoto—Dragon Ball Z: Budokai Tenkaichi as Nam
Tsutomu Kashiwakura—Monster Farm as Gully
Masato Oba—Kinnikuman Generations as Geronimo
Shinichiro Ohta—Kinnikuman Muscle Generations as Screw Kid
Toshiyuki Morikawa—Tales of Phantasia OVA and PSP version as Daos
Tetsu Inada—Tales of Phantasia PSP version as Brambert Milene
Rokuro Naya—Kyoro-chan as Inspector Nirami
Daisuke Namikawa—The Heroic Legend of Arslan as Narsus
Koji Yusa—Nadia: The Secret of Blue Water video game as Neo Emperor
Jun Fukuyama—Metal Gear Solid: Portable Ops as Gray Fox
Keisuke Oda—SD Gundam G Generation Spirit as Brand Freeze
Toru Okawa—Ai no Kusabi as Iason Mink
Kenjiro Tsuda—SD Gundam G Generation Over World as Brand Freeze
Ryotaro Okiayu—Digimon PSP version as Devimon, Dragon Ball ZW Bakuretsu Impact as Samsung Ryuyaku
Jurota Kosugi—Hoshikai series radio drama as Dusanyu
Hikaru Midorikawa—Shōnan Bakusōzoku pachinko version as Yousuke Eguchi
Mamoru Miyano—Sailor Moon Crystal as Prince Demande
Hiroshi Kamiya—Shin-chan as Buriburizaemon
Kiyoto Yoshikai—Space Battleship Yamato 2199 as Lyle Ghetto

Other roles
Sotsugyou M as Kawazoe Haruka

References

External links
 
 
 

1954 births
2000 deaths
Accidental deaths from falls
Accidental deaths in Japan
Japanese male stage actors
Japanese male video game actors
Japanese male voice actors
Male voice actors from Tokyo
20th-century Japanese male actors
21st-century Japanese male actors
Aoni Production voice actors